Flyer II is a yacht. She won the 1981–82 Whitbread Round the World Race skippered by Conny van Rietschoten.

1981–82 Flyer II crew

Conny van Rietschoten – Skipper
Aedgard Koekebakker – Watchleader
Erle Williams – Watchleader/Shipwright
Daniel Wlochovski – Navigator/Electrician
Joey Allen
Patrick Antelme – Cook
Bill Biewenga
Warwick Buckley
Grant Dalton – Sailmaker
Lobo Fischer
Julian Fuller – Doctor
Steve Harrison – Rigger
George Hendy
Roger Janes
Russell Pickthall – Sailmaker
Dirk Reidel
Michel Santander
 Onne van der Wal – Engineer/Photographer
John Vitali

References

Volvo Ocean Race yachts
Sailing yachts of the Netherlands